The Air Force Data Systems Design Center (AFDSDC) was activated on 26 Oct 1967. The unit was located at Bolling Air Force Base in Washington D.C. Its mission was to analyze, design, develop, program, test, implement and maintain all automated data processing systems; incorporate HQ USAF-approved integration and interface requirements in assigned automated data systems; develop and maintain general purpose software required by assigned systems; and develop and recommend standards covering programming languages and documentation requirements for automated data systems. The AFDSDC moved to Gunter AFS in 1971 and has since gone through a number of transformations including: Headquarters Air Force Teleprocessing Center (1984); Headquarters Standard Information Systems Center (1985); Headquarters Standard Systems Center (1986); Headquarters Standard Systems Group (1995); 554th Electronic Systems Wing (2006), Enterprise Information Systems Directorate (July 2010), Business and Enterprise Systems (September 2011).

References

 Centers of the United States Air Force